TTAG may refer to:

Organizations
The Truth About Guns
Trinidad and Tobago Air Guard